Bolgatanga Manchester City F.C. (commonly known as Bolga Man City) is a Ghanaian football club based in Bolgatanga, currently competing in Division Two of the Ghanaian league system. As a Second Division club, they are also entitled to enter the Ghanaian FA Cup.

Named after English Premier League side Manchester City, they play in an all-blue home kit with white trim, though no official links exist between the two clubs.

History
Bolga Man City were founded on 1 February 1993 by Abukari Fusein.

References

External links
 https://web.archive.org/web/20140220235521/http://rsssf.com/tablesg/gha2014.html

Football clubs in Ghana
Manchester City F.C. Bolgatanga
Upper East Region
1993 establishments in Ghana
Association football clubs established in 1993